Amydria is a genus of moths in the family Acrolophidae.

Species
Amydria abscensella
Amydria anceps
Amydria apachella
Amydria arizonella
Amydria brevipennella
Amydria clemensella
Amydria confusella
Amydria curvistrigella
Amydria dyarella
Amydria effrentella
Amydria margoriella
Amydria meridionalis
Amydria muricolor
Amydria obliquella
Amydria onagella
Amydria pauculella
Amydria pogonites
Amydria selvae
Amydria taracta

References

Acrolophidae